The 1990 Newsweek Champions Cup and the Virginia Slims of Indian Wells Cup were tennis tournaments played on outdoor hard courts. It was the 17th edition of the tournament, and was part of the ATP Super 9 of the 1990 ATP Tour, and of the Tier II Series of the 1990 WTA Tour.  It was held from March 6 to March 20, 1990.

The men's singles draw was headlined by Boris Becker and Stefan Edberg. Other top seeds were Brad Gilbert, Aaron Krickstein, and Andre Agassi.

The women's singles draw featured Martina Navratilova and Conchita Martínez. Other top seeds present were Helena Suková, Jana Novotná, and Katerina Maleeva.

Finals

Men's singles

 Stefan Edberg defeated  Andre Agassi, 6–4, 5–7, 7–6, 7–6
It was Stefan Edberg's 1st title of the year and his 22nd overall. It was his 1st Masters title.

Women's singles

 Martina Navratilova defeated  Helena Suková, 6–2, 5–7, 6–1, 
It was Martina Navratilova's 3rd title of the year and the 149th of her career.

Men's doubles

 Boris Becker /  Guy Forget defeated  Jim Grabb /  Patrick McEnroe, 4–6, 6–4, 6–3

Women's doubles

 Jana Novotná /  Helena Suková defeated  Gigi Fernández /  Martina Navratilova, 6–2, 7–6(8–6)

References

External links
 
 Association of Tennis Professionals (ATP) tournament profile

 
1990 Newsweek Champions Cup and the Virginia Slims of Indian Wells
Virginia Slims of Indian Wells
Newsweek Champions Cup
Newsweek Champions Cup
Newsweek Champions Cup and the Virginia Slims of Indian Wells